Korab II is a mountain in Albania. The peak has no name which does not appear on maps of the area. The height of Korab II though could be many metres higher or even just a few metres lower than Mount Korab.

References

Mountains of Albania